The 2005 Dr. Pepper Big 12 Championship Game was held at Reliant Stadium on December 3, 2005. The game saw the Big 12 South champions Texas Longhorns take on the Colorado Buffaloes, winners of the Big 12 North. Texas, undefeated and at #2 in the BCS standings, was looking to travel to the national championship.

Texas defeated Colorado, 70–3. The win was the 8th largest margin of victory in Texas football history, and sent the Longhorns to the BCS title game in Pasadena, where they defeated USC 41–38. The game would also be the last for Colorado head coach Gary Barnett, who was replaced on December 15 by Dan Hawkins. Colorado would go on to lose 19–10 to Clemson in the Champs Sports Bowl.

Scoring summary

1st Quarter 
 09:44 UT – Melton, Henry 1 yd run (Pino, David kick)
 05:59 UT – Charles, Jamaal 3 yd pass from Young, Vince (Pino, David kick)

2nd Quarter
 14:48 CU – Crosby, Mason 25 yd FG
 12:00 UT – Young, Vince 2 yd run (Pino, David kick)
 11:37 UT – Sweed, Limas 31 yd pass from Young, Vince (Pino, David kick)
 07:20 UT – Thomas, David 8 yd pass from Young, Vince (Pino, David kick)
 00:25 UT – Charles, Jamaal 2 yd run (Pino, David kick)

3rd Quarter
 11:26 UT – Young, Selvin 4 yd run (Pino, David kick)
 10:21 UT – Foster, Brandon 0 yd blocked punt return (Pino, David kick)
 09:59 UT – Charles, Jamaal 26 yd run (Pino, David kick)
 07:36 UT – Melton, Henry 1 yd run (Pino, David kick)

References

External links
 Big 12 Championship Game Preview
 Recap + Box Score – Big12 Sports.com

Championship Game
Big 12 Championship Game
Colorado Buffaloes football games
Texas Longhorns football games
American football competitions in Houston
December 2005 sports events in the United States
Big 12 Championship